, the Book of Mormon has been translated into 115 languages, and there are active projects to translate it into a number of other languages. Portions of the book, as opposed to complete translations, have also been conducted for another 20 languages.  These tables show all the versions of the Book of Mormon that have been translated. Unless otherwise indicated, the translation was financed and the resulting text published by the Church of Jesus Christ of Latter-day Saints, which is by far the largest church in the Latter Day Saint movement. Not all translations are currently in print. As of 2021, the Church of Jesus Christ of Latter-day Saints continues to publish at least portions of the Book of Mormon in 115 languages. The Community of Christ, the second largest church in the Latter Day Saint movement, has also published its own translations of the work in various languages, though becoming increasingly less common to find. The Church of Jesus Christ (Bickertonite) has published their own respective editions of the Book of Mormon in Italian, Spanish, and various small languages meant only for Locals, and published in the Respective Nations. The Church of Christ (Temple Lot) publishes the Book of Mormon in Spanish.

The following list provides details on officially translated versions of the Book of Mormon published by the  Church of Jesus Christ of Latter-day Saints, as well as translations in languages not published by the Church of Jesus Christ of Latter-day Saints.

Complete translations

Selections only

Translations in progress

Out of print

Translations not published by the Church of Jesus Christ of Latter-day Saints

The Community of Christ once published in several languages, providing the scriptures in several of the languages above, but most are out of print, with seemingly plans to discontinue printing of scriptures.

See also
LDS edition of the Bible
Standard works

References

Latter Day Saint movement lists
Translations
Translation-related lists
List of translations
Translations
Harold B. Lee Library-related Americana articles